Lotta Runesson is a Swedish football midfielder, currently playing for Karlskronas FF in the Division 3. She previously played for Östers IF, Umeå IK and Linköping FC in the Damallsvenskan.

She was an Under-21 international.

References

1981 births
Living people
Swedish women's footballers
Place of birth missing (living people)
Women's association football midfielders